English Creek is a stream in Oregon County of southern Missouri and Fulton County of northern Arkansas. It is a tributary of Spring River.

The stream source area lies southeast of Koshkonong and it flows south past the east side of Grand Gulf State Park and under Missouri Route 142 southwest of Thayer.  The stream enters Fulton County and passes under Arkansas Highway 9 west of Mammoth Spring. The stream flows southeast passing under Arkansas Highway 289 to its confluence with the Spring River about one mile north of King.

English Creek has the name of the local English family.

See also
List of rivers of Arkansas
List of rivers of Missouri

References

Rivers of Fulton County, Arkansas
Rivers of Oregon County, Missouri
Rivers of Arkansas
Rivers of Missouri